William McMillan  (31 August 1887 – 25 September 1977) was a Scottish sculptor, notable for a number of public statues in the United Kingdom.

Biography

McMillan was born at 37 Powis Place, Aberdeen, Scotland, the son of William McMillan, a master engraver, and Jane Knight. He studied at Gray's School of Art in Aberdeen and then at the Royal College of Art in London from 1908 to 1912, under Édouard Lantéri.
McMillan joined The Artists Rifles in World War I, and served as an officer in the 5th Oxfordshire and Buckinghamshire Light Infantry during the conflict. In 1916, he married Dorothy, daughter of the Carlisle architect Maurice Charles Williams. They had no children.

In 1919 McMillan was awarded a commission by the British Government to design the artwork for the British Armed Forces World War I campaign medals, to be issued to all personnel who had seen active service in theatres of war during the conflict. For the Victory campaign medal he created a design utilizing a relief engraving of the classical Greek goddess Nike, with the text THE GREAT WAR FOR CIVILISATION 1914–1919; and for the British War Medal he sculpted a relief in Greek Classical style of Saint George upon a horse trampling the emblems of the defeated German Empire. This would be the most prolific artwork of his career, with almost twelve million of these medals being issued in combination within the United Kingdom and across the globe throughout the British Empire.

McMillan exhibited at the Royal Academy in London from 1917 until 1971. He was elected an associate of the Academy in 1925, a full member in 1933 and a Senior RA in 1962. From 1929 to 1941 he was Master of the Royal Academy Sculpture School.

From 1940 to 1966 McMillan became involved in a number of important and prestigious public commissions, and became more widely recognised at international level. He was made a Commander of the Royal Victorian Order (CVO) in 1956. His home city of Aberdeen made him a Freeman of the City and Aberdeen University conferred an honorary doctorate upon him.

For most of his career he had a studio at Glebe Place in Chelsea, London, and was a member of the Chelsea Arts Club. A faux blue plaque exists at 63 Glebe Place, stating "William McMillan lived here". Even if this were the correct address, Glebe Place was his place of work not residence. In his later years he lived at 3 Cholmondley Walk, Richmond, London. Shortly after his 90th birthday in September 1977 he was assaulted and robbed. He died of his injuries on 25 September 1977 in a hospital in Richmond upon Thames. He was buried at Richmond Cemetery.

Selected works

1920-1939

1940-1949

1950-1959

1960 and later

Other works
The Invocation, 1910
Commissioned to design both the "British War Medal" and "Victory Medal", 1919
Bust of A. G. Macdonnell, author, 1923
Syrinx, Kelvingrove Art Gallery, Glasgow, 1925
Tam O’Shanter, 1926
Statuette in green slate, 1927
Memorial plaque to Sir Aston Webb, 1930, St Paul's Cathedral, London
Dancer, 1931
The Birth of Venus, marble, Tate Gallery, 1931
Statue of J. M. W. Turner, commissioned by the Royal Academy, 1936 
The Naked Truth, 1936
Mother and Child, 1938
 King George V, 1938, bronze statue, originally erected in Eden Gardens, Kolkata and moved to Barrackpore during the 1970s

References

External links

 

1887 births
1977 deaths
20th-century British sculptors
20th-century Scottish male artists
Alumni of Gray's School of Art
Alumni of the Royal College of Art
Artists from Aberdeen
Artists' Rifles soldiers
British Army personnel of World War I
Burials at Richmond Cemetery
Deaths by beating in the United Kingdom
Oxfordshire and Buckinghamshire Light Infantry officers
Royal Academicians
Scottish male sculptors